La Paz is a Mexico City Metro station that serves Line A. It is the line's terminal station. It opened, along with the other stations along Line A, on 12 August 1991.  It is located in Los Reyes Acaquilpan, State of Mexico – a city that is the municipal seat of the La Paz municipality.

The logo for the station is a dove in flight, since La Paz means "Peace".

Exits
North: Mexico-Puebla Federal Highway, La Paz
South: Mexico-Puebla Federal Highway, La Paz

Ridership

Gallery

References

External links 

 

Mexico City Metro Line A stations
Railway stations opened in 1991
1991 establishments in Mexico
La Paz, State of Mexico
Mexico City Metro stations outside Mexico City
Accessible Mexico City Metro stations